Indirect elections to a National Assembly were held in the parts of Portuguese Guinea held by the rebel African Party for the Independence of Guinea and Cape Verde (PAIGC) between August and October 1972, but not in the Portuguese-controlled areas of Bissau, Bolama, the Bissagos Islands and Bafatá.

A single list of PAIGC candidates for Regional Councils was approved by 97% of voters with a 93.4% turnout. The number of people voting was approximately 32% of the voting-age population.

Electoral system
Voters elected 273 members of 11 regional councils. The elected councillors then convened to elect 91 members of the 120-seat National Assembly. The remaining 29 seats were to represent the four regions still under Portuguese control, and these members were chosen by the PAIGC.

The elections took six weeks, with ballot papers carried around the country on foot. The ballot papers had been printed in neighbouring Guinea.

Results

Aftermath
The new National Assembly met for the first time in Boe on 24 September 1973.

References

Portuguese Guinea
1972 in Portuguese Guinea
Elections in Guinea-Bissau
One-party elections
Election and referendum articles with incomplete results
August 1972 events in Africa
September 1972 events in Africa
October 1972 events in Africa